The women's heptathlon at the 2010 European Athletics Championships was held at the Estadi Olímpic Lluís Companys on 30 and 31 July.

Medalists

Records

Schedule

Results

100 metres hurdles

Heat 1

Heat 2

Heat 3

High jump

Shot put

200 metres

Heat 1

Heat 2

Heat 3

Long jump

Javelin throw

800 metres

Heat 1

Heat 2

Final standings

References
 Participants list
 100 m hurdles results
 High jump results
 Shot put results
 200m results
 Long jump results
 Javelin throw results
 800 m results
 Final standings

Heptathlon
Combined events at the European Athletics Championships
2010 in women's athletics